Tanr Balidih is a census town in the Jaridih CD block in the Bermo subdivision of the Bokaro district in the Indian state of Jharkhand.

Geography

Location                     

Area overview
Bokaro district consists of undulating uplands on the Chota Nagpur Plateau with the Damodar River cutting a valley right across. The East Bokaro Coalfield located in the Bermo-Phusro area and small intrusions of Jharia Coalfield make Bokaro a coal rich district. In 1965, one of the largest steel manufacturing units in the country, Bokaro Steel Plant, operated by Steel Authority of India Limited, was set-up at Bokaro Steel City. The Damodar Valley Corporation established its first thermal power station at Bokaro (Thermal). The soil is generally infertile and agriculture is mostly rain-fed.

Note: The map alongside presents some of the notable locations in the district. All places marked in the map are linked in the larger full screen map.

Demographics
According to the 2011 Census of India, Tanr Balidih had a total population of 7,982, of which 4,197 (53%) were males and 3,785 (47%) were females. Population in the age range 0–6 years was 1,026. The total number of literate persons in Tanr Balidih was 5,418 (77.89% of the population over 6 years).

Infrastructure
According to the District Census Handbook 2011, Bokaro, Tanr Balidih  covered an area of 4.75 km2. Among the civic amenities, it had 1 km roads with open drains, the protected water supply involved uncovered well, handpump. It had 1,288 domestic electric connections. Among the medical facilities, it had 5 hospitals, 6 dispensaries, 6 health centres, 6 family welfare centres, 5 maternity and child welfare centres, 5 maternity homes, 11 nursing homes, no medicine shop. Among the educational facilities it had 2 primary schools, 1 middle school, 2 secondary schools,  the nearest senior secondary school, general degree college at Balidih 2 km away. It had 4 non-formal educational centres (Sarva Siksha Abhiyan). It had the branch office of 1 agricultural credit society.

References

Cities and towns in Bokaro district